Altamahaw Mill Office is a historic office building located at Altamahaw, Alamance County, North Carolina. It was built in 1890, and is an irregular shaped, 2 1/2-story, Queen Anne style brick office building.  It features an intersecting bell-cast roof, a decorative chimney, and a wide band of brown and cream-colored bricks.

It was added to the National Register of Historic Places in 1984.

References

Office buildings on the National Register of Historic Places in North Carolina
Queen Anne architecture in North Carolina
Office buildings completed in 1890
Buildings and structures in Burlington, North Carolina
National Register of Historic Places in Alamance County, North Carolina